Rufus J. Ivey House is a historic home located near Raleigh, Wake County, North Carolina.  It was built about 1872, and is a two-story, "L"-shaped, Italianate-style brick dwelling with a steeply pitched cross-gable roof. It features a one-story porch with a low hipped roof.

It was listed on the National Register of Historic Places in 2006.

References

Houses on the National Register of Historic Places in North Carolina
Italianate architecture in North Carolina
Houses completed in 1872
Houses in Wake County, North Carolina
National Register of Historic Places in Wake County, North Carolina